Richard Michael Genelle (October 12, 1961 – December 30, 2008) was an entrepreneur and actor best known for playing Ernie on the children's television series Mighty Morphin Power Rangers.

From 1993 until 1997, Genelle portrayed Ernie, the good-natured owner of the Angel Grove Youth Center, the most popular hang out spot for the teenagers of Angel Grove. He often hosted birthday parties, school activities, martial arts tournaments and community charity events.  He also gave out free drinks and food as well as helping out his customers if they needed something. After four seasons, Ernie abruptly left the Youth Center to do emergency volunteer work in South America, passing ownership of the Youth Center to Jerome Stone.

In real life, Genelle left the series to take steps to overcome his smoking problems and obesity, successfully losing over forty pounds. He also started Retail Logistics Solutions, Inc. in Cerritos, California, providing transportation services.

Genelle died following a heart attack on December 30, 2008, at age forty-seven. His funeral service was held at Pierce Brothers Crestlawn Memorial Park in Riverside, California. His interment was in that cemetery.

Filmography

References

External links
 

1961 births
2008 deaths
American male television actors
20th-century American male actors